Nicola Tumolero (born 24 September 1994) is an Italian speed skater.

Skating career
Tumolero won gold in the 5,000 meters at the 2018 European Speed Skating Championships.  This was Italy's second-ever gold at the European championships, following the all-around win by Enrico Fabris 12 years earlier.

Personal life
Tumolero is a police officer in Asiago.

Personal records

He is currently in 20th position in the adelskalender.

References

External links
 

Living people
Italian male speed skaters
People from Asiago
Speed skaters at the 2018 Winter Olympics
Olympic speed skaters of Italy
Medalists at the 2018 Winter Olympics
Olympic bronze medalists for Italy
Olympic medalists in speed skating
1994 births
Speed skaters of Fiamme Oro
Sportspeople from the Province of Vicenza
20th-century Italian people
21st-century Italian people